Child in the House is a 1956 British drama film directed by Cy Endfield about a girl who struggles to cope with her uncaring relatives. The film stars Phyllis Calvert, Eric Portman and Stanley Baker, and was based on the novel A Child in the House by Janet McNeill.

Cast
 Phyllis Calvert as Evelyn Acheson 
 Eric Portman as Henry Acheson 
 Stanley Baker as Stephen Lorimer 
 Mandy Miller as  Elizabeth Lorimer 
 Dora Bryan as Cassie 
 Joan Hickson as Cook 
 Victor Maddern as Bert 
 Percy Herbert as Detective Sergeant Taylor 
 Joan Benham as Vera McNally 
 Martin Miller as Professor Topolski 
 Christopher Toyne as Peter McNally 
 Molly Urquhart as Mrs Parsons 
 Bruce Beeby as Constable Jennings 
 Peter Burton as Howard Forbes 
 Maggie Smith as Party guest (screen debut - uncredited)
 Alfie Bass as Ticket collector

Critical reception
TV Guide called the film a "calculated tearjerker"; while the Radio Times called it, "good for a tear or two, though Portman and Calvert are rather oddly cast."

References

External links

1956 films
1956 drama films
Films directed by Cy Endfield
Films scored by Mario Nascimbene
British drama films
1950s English-language films
1950s British films
British black-and-white films